Sobraliinae is a subtribe of orchids (family Orchidaceae). Sobraliinae includes two genera, Elleanthus and Sobralia.

Orchid subtribes
Arethuseae